They Don't Change Under Moonlight is the debut mini album from Welsh rock band Tiger Please which was released 2 November 2009.

Critical reception

Reviews for the album have been generally very positive. The Digital Fix called the album "a phenomenal piece of work that has come out of absolutely nowhere", particularly praising Leon Stanford's voice and the band's ability to be ambitious to a grandiose extent yet personal and heartfelt at the same time. Punktastic similarly praised Stanford's vocals and remarked that "There have been so many talented Welsh bands in the last few years and Tiger Please are among the best." "[The album] contains not a single weak moment. From start to end this young Welsh five-piece offer a mighty, vibrant blend of muscularity and delicacy, mixing cinematic Gaslight Anthem-like storytelling with the gruff homebrewed rock vintage of Pearl Jam," wrote David McLaughlin of Kerrang!.

Track listing
All songs written by Tiger Please.

 "[Untitled Track]" - 0:23
 "Strawberry Moon" - 3:54
 "Set Sail" - 1:21
 "The Armada" - 3:43
 "Let Me In" - 0:19
 "There's No Hero In Heroin" - 4:04
 "City Lights" - 1:27
 "Without Country" - 3:36
 "[Untitled Track]" - 1:01
 "This Side Of This Town" - 5:10
 "Lullabye" - 0:32
 "Lights & Sound" - 4:24

Personnel
Tiger Please
 Leon Stanford – vocals
 Tyla Campbell – guitars
 Luc Morris – guitars
 Jimmi Kendall – bass
 Lewis Rowsell – drums

Additional musicians
 Clare Baxter – violin
 Sophia Glennon – violin
 Jonny Hoyle – viola
 Emyr Gruffydd – cello
 Neil Starr – additional vocals

References

2009 albums
Tiger Please albums